Damian and the Dragon: Modern Greek Folk-Tales is a 1965 anthology of 21 tales that have been collected and retold by Ruth Manning-Sanders.

It is one in a long series of such anthologies by Manning-Sanders. This book was published in the United Kingdom in 1965, by Oxford University Press.

Table of contents
Damian and the Dragon
My Lady Sea
The Four Fishes
Penteclemas and the Pea
Big Matsiko
The Prince and the Vizier's Son
The Bay-Tree Maiden
The Cats
Yiankos
The Cunning Old Man and the Three Rogues
The Wild Man
My Candlestick
The Melodious Napkin
Alas!
The Lion, the Tiger and the Eagle
The Golden Casket
The Beardless One
The Sleeping Prince
The Three Precepts
The Twins
Luck

References

Collections of fairy tales
Children's short story collections
1965 short story collections
Greek fairy tales
1965 children's books
British children's books
Books about cats
1965 anthologies